Mount Wood is a mountain, 1,230 m, standing west of Gardner Inlet and 24 km (15 mi) west of Mount Austin on the east coast of Palmer Land. Discovered by the Ronne Antarctic Research Expedition (RARE) 1947–48, under Ronne, who named this mountain for E.A. Wood, ship's engineer with the expedition.

Mountains of Palmer Land